Mimar Sinan Sport Hall is an indoor multi-purpose sport venue that is located in the Edirne, Turkey. Opened in 1971, the hall has a seating capacity of 2,000 spectators. It is home to Olin Edirne, which plays currently in the Turkish Basketball League.

References

Sport in Edirne
Sports venues completed in 1971
Indoor arenas in Turkey
Basketball venues in Turkey
Turkish Basketball League venues
Buildings and structures in Edirne
Tourist attractions in Edirne